Micah Fitzerman-Blue is an American screenwriter, director and producer. He is best known for his work on Maleficent: Mistress of Evil, A Beautiful Day in the Neighborhood and Painkiller.

References

External links 

American television writers
American male television writers
American television producers
American screenwriters
Showrunners
Living people
Year of birth missing (living people)